Grambling is a city in Lincoln Parish, Louisiana, United States. The population was 5,239 in 2020. The city is home to Grambling State University and is part of the Ruston micropolitan statistical area.

Grambling was designated a "City" in the early 1990s (either in 1992 or 1993), but was erroneously considered a "Town" during the 2000 census.

Geography
Grambling is located at  (32.527427, -92.713987).

Demographics

As of the 2020 United States census, there were 5,239 people, 1,812 households, and 1,118 families residing in the city.

Arts and culture

Grambling Memorial Gardens
Eddie G. Robinson Museum

Education
The city is home to Grambling State University, a public, coeducational, and historically black university founded in 1901 & accredited in 1949.

Lincoln Preparatory School is a charter school located in Grambling that serves (Grades K-12).

Notable people
Edward H. Adams (1910-1958), basketball player & coach
Jophery Brown (1945-2014), stuntman and Chicago Cubs pitcher, was born in Grambling.
Ralph Garr (1945-), baseball player, attended college at Grambling State University.
Paul Millsap (1985-), professional basketball player with the Denver Nuggets.
Eddie Robinson (1919-2007), head football coach at Grambling and second winningest coach in NCAA Division I football history.
Paul "Tank" Younger, (1928-2001) NFL player, NFL's first African-American front-office executive and College Football Hall of Fame member.
Doug Williams (1955-), player and head football coach at Grambling, the first Black quarterback to both start and win a Super Bowl.

References

External links
http://cityofgrambling.org/

 
Cities in Louisiana
Cities in Lincoln Parish, Louisiana
Cities in Ruston, Louisiana micropolitan area
Cities in the Ark-La-Tex